On the morning of June 13, 1914, a disastrous fire and a series of related explosions occurred in the main film vault of the Lubin Manufacturing Company in Philadelphia, Pennsylvania. Several possible causes for the blaze were cited at the time, one being "spontaneous combustion" of highly flammable nitrate film, which was the motion picture industry's standard medium for cameras throughout the silent era and for the first two decades of "talking pictures". Millions of feet of film were consumed in the flames, including most of the master negatives and initial prints of Lubin's pre-1914 catalog, several of the company's recently completed theatrical prints ready for release and distribution, a considerable number of films produced by other studios, inventories of raw and stock footage, hundreds of reels documenting historic events that occurred between 1897 and early 1914, as well as other films related to notable political and military figures, innovations in medical science, and professional athletic contests from that period. While this fire was not a decisive factor in Lubin's decline and bankruptcy by September 1916, costs associated with the disaster only added to the corporation's mounting debts, which led to the closure or sale of its remaining operations the following year.

"Lubinville" in Philadelphia

In 1902, after five years of filming assorted rudimentary motion pictures, pioneer studio mogul Siegmund Lubin officially formed the Lubin Manufacturing Company in Philadelphia. Several buildings in the city served as the company's early downtown headquarters and production facilities, but the rapid growth of Lubin's business demanded much larger accommodations, so in 1910 he constructed a state-of-the-art studio and film-processing plant in North Philadelphia at the intersection of 20th Street and Indiana Avenue.

The studio had a slanted glass roof and glass walls supported by light steel framing. It also had costume rooms, property rooms, areas for set construction and equipment repair, a cafeteria, spaces for every phase of film processing, a large garage for servicing the plant's fleet of trucks and Lozier touring cars, and a five-story building that housed administrative offices, shops on its top floor for the manufacture of projectors, and the plant's shipping department in its basement. Also at Lubinville was the most up-to-date vault for storing and organizing the company's growing catalog of master negatives and prints for its theatrical releases, its historical films, and all other footage under its care.

In addition to generating revenue from its own motion pictures, Lubinville earned substantial income by processing and assembling theatrical print copies for other studios, which explains why some master negatives and test prints for productions made by other companies were also stored in Lubinville's film vault. Various studios sent their negatives to Lubin for printing, for the Philadelphia firm was highly regarded in the motion picture industry for the superior clarity of its footage, a reputation represented by the company's logo, the image of the Liberty Bell accompanied by the motto "Clear As A Bell". In one of its 1914 issues, the trade paper Billboard explained how Lubinville received, processed, edited to specifications, and stored films for its studio customers:

The film vault
Lubinville's film vault was located at the "extreme southeastern corner of the plant", and for safety reasons it was positioned outside employee work areas and situated on the perimeter of the complex. The vault's lengthy front side, however, did not face empty lots; it faced North Garnet Street, a narrow residential street lined on the other side with two-story brick row houses. Every precaution was taken to minimize the possibility of fire in and around the vault since the dangers of using and storing volatile thermoplastic film stocks were very well known in 1914 and were subjects of ongoing concern in the motion picture industry. The standard film type used by studios at the time was composed of celluloid, which photographic companies manufactured by treating nitrocellulose with camphor as a plasticizer. The combination produced a flexible and effective film strip for cameras, but it was also a highly sensitive material that could be easily ignited and burned intensely. Celluloid film, also referred to as nitrate film owing to its nitrocellulose base, only became more unstable and more hazardous as it aged. Off-gassing and heat were byproducts of the material as it continued to degrade over time, especially in storage conditions with excessive humidity and elevated temperatures. Film cans or reels containing deteriorating nitrate stock had the capability of "autoigniting" or spontaneously combusting. Once burning, the film was extremely difficult to extinguish since celluloid contains sufficient oxygen within its molecular structure to continue burning even when fully immersed in water.

This chambered configuration was intended to minimize losses and contain a blaze if one unit ever caught fire, reducing the likelihood of its migration to the other four. No lighting fixtures or devices with electrical "wiring of any sort" were installed inside the units. In late afternoons or on overcast days when more light was needed, assigned "runners" or any other Lubin employee who entered the vault to retrieve, return, or to organize films, that person was required to use only a special battery-powered "hand flashlight". Air exchange inside each unit relied on a passive ventilation system consisting of four "grated windows near the roof" and two vents at the base of the unit's back wall on the factory side of the vault. To prevent the spread of fires and to protect further both the vault and employee work spaces inside the plant, a "heavy double fireproof wall" of brick and reinforced concrete was incorporated into the factory's perimeter wall that was set back from the vault and ran the entire length of the five units.

Fire-safety standards at the plant
Unlike New York City's infamous 1911 Triangle Shirtwaist Factory, where 146 employees died in a cluttered working environment with poor safety standards, Lubinville's facilities in uptown Philadelphia were for their time models of fire prevention, evacuation procedures, and fire-suppression capability. Lubin, like other motion picture studios and film-processing plants in that period, stored large quantities of exposed and raw nitrate stock, a material that seemed "determined to destroy itself", very often in flames by its "own volition". Reels and cans containing nitrate footage therefore posed a constant fire threat, with blazes at storage sites regularly reported in newspapers and trade publications in which film stock was blamed either as the cause for greatly accelerating and spreading the flames.

Prior to the fire at Lubinville, employees there were described as working "secure in the knowledge that there was no place in the plant where a fire extinguisher or fire hose was not plainly visible and functional". All exits throughout the complex were marked and kept unobstructed in accordance with not only Philadelphia fire regulations but also at the insistence of Siegmund Lubin himself. Fire drills were regularly held, and work areas were "maintained in a scrupulous state of Teutonic tidiness". Fire-safety rules were also rigorously followed and were described by employees to be "'as strict as those of a battleship'".

Despite Lubin's attention to safety procedures, fire remained an ongoing concern at the plant and throughout the film industry in the summer of 1914, a concern heightened by three very destructive fires that occurred at other companies earlier in the year. On March 19, flames swept through the plant of the Eclair Moving Picture Company in Fort Lee, New Jersey, causing $750,000 in damages ($ today). Several buildings there and films in that studio's "fireproof" vault burned. News reports stated that the facility was "adequately equipped with hose lines", but employees were unable to battle the fire because there was no water pressure. Just nine days later, Edison's studio in New York City, in the Bronx, was very heavily damaged by fire. Then, on May 13, 1914, exactly a month before the Lubinville disaster, yet another fire destroyed a large collection of films at Universal Pictures and "gutted" much of that company's six-story Colonial Hall facility at 102 West 101st Street in Manhattan. However, none of those earlier 1914 events was traced directly to spontaneous combustion or to some other film-related cause. At Eclair the fire originated near a production being staged inside the studio; at Edison a short circuit inside a lighting switchboard was blamed; and "defective insulation" was cited as the source of Universal's costly accident. Still, when the fires reached and ignited large quantities of film stored at all three locations, the blazes immediately intensified and spread rapidly, adding greatly to the firefighters' tasks of extinguishing the flames and increasing substantially the damage and repair costs at the sites. Unfortunately for Edison, the company suffered a much worse fire at its headquarters in West Orange, New Jersey later in 1914, on December 9. The origin of that catastrophic $7,000,000 loss for Edison ($ today) was attributed to "an exploding film" inside a building where nitrate footage was stored and inspected. That structure and several other larger buildings were completely destroyed, as were "all the Edison photoplays" kept at that site, along with "cameras and m. p. [motion picture] apparatus of immense value".

June 13 fire and explosions
On Saturday morning, June 13, 1914, during an extended summer heat wave in Philadelphia, "several hundred" employees were working at Lubinville. Suddenly, "shortly after" 10 a.m., they heard and felt a "terrific" explosion on the far east side of the complex. An undetected fire burning in one of the film vault's five units ignited celluloid gases that had built up inside the brick-and-concrete container. The resulting explosion had "ripped out the street side" of the structure and "shattered its roof", spreading the fire to other units, quickly setting alight millions of feet of highly flammable film stock and detonating three more violent explosions. "Flames shooting into the air over a hundred feet" and columns of thick dark smoke dominated the northern skyline of the city as the blasts hurled hundreds of metal film reels and cans with "blazing celluloid" in all directions, many high above the plant. Seconds later, the "flying" reels, can lids, and fragments of footage began raining down, setting off more fires both on and off the Lubin property as the odors of sulfur dioxide and other toxic gases from the burning film filled the area.

With the collapse of the vault's walls from the explosions, fire spread to the plant's printing rooms and shops, and then to part of the site's highest structure, its five-story main building. Burning debris continued to fall from the sky, igniting additional small fires throughout the central compound. Several row houses on the other side of North Garnet Street were roasted by the fiery blasts, as were cars parked along the narrow street. Then other houses began to smolder and ignite. Gathering at safe distances around the film factory, groups of stunned neighbors watched the inferno. Soon they were joined by Lubin set technicians, carpenters, film developers and assembly workers, mechanics, administrative staff, and actors, all of whom, after years of fire-drill training, had quickly evacuated their respective work areas. Some employees dared to remain behind in several plant locations in attempts to save "costly gowns and dresses of actresses"; grab drafts of "scenarios", completed scripts, and other important paperwork; and to carry out manageable pieces of expensive film-processing and production equipment.

The center of destruction, the vault area, lay largely in heaps of charred rubble littered with twisted rebar, mangled covers and bases of film cans, and melted projection reels. The brick walls and contents of four of the vault's units were entirely destroyed; the fifth unit, though severely damaged, was left standing. That structure survived total destruction because it served as future storage space for Lubin's growing catalog of negatives and prints. The unit was therefore filled largely with empty reels and empty film cans. If any supplies of unexposed or "raw" film stock were also kept in that space, the amounts were not in sufficient quantities to create enough explosive power to blow out the unit's heavy security door and demolish all of its walls.

Actors who provided assistance

Lubin employees, given the scope of the disaster, were thankful that favorable winds that day allowed the Philadelphia Fire Department to bring the widespread flames under control in less than an hour. City firefighters were also aided by plant personnel who were already using the site's own emergency water hoses and its ample supply of extinguishers when the municipal fire crews arrived. The New York Times in its coverage of the fiery explosions specifically recognized some of Lubin's actors and a visitor to the studio for their heroic efforts in assisting injured evacuees, saving lives, and battling the flames. "Among the moving picture actors who quickly acted heroes in real life", reported The Times, "were Charles S. Schultz, Frank Daniels, Joseph Boyle, Frank Haesler, Harry Myers, and Thomas Walsh." "Some of them", added the newspaper, "got a ladder and, climbing to the roof of the building, fought the fire with good effect."

The visitor to the plant who was credited with saving Lubin employees from serious injury or possible death was a local professional boxer, Willie Houck. The featherweight title contender lived close to Lubinville, in the neighborhood of Mt. Airy in Northwest Philadelphia. Referred to as a "pugilist" and "lately a movie actor" in news coverage of the fire, Houck was reported to be "posing" in the studio for cameras when he heard the first explosion. Both The New York Times and the Chicago-based trade journal  Motography described how the young boxer then "saved several girls who were in a panic at a window and about to jump."

Suspected causes
While the origin of the fire remained questionable and was never officially verified in subsequent investigations, some authorities and reports in trade publications in 1914 immediately attributed it to spontaneous combustion. One other theory that gained greater traction in the days and weeks after the disaster blamed Philadelphia's prolonged heat wave and the intense summer sun. Although not issued as the definitive and official cause for the disaster, it was the personal opinion of Ira M. Lowry, who was Lubinville's general manager and the son-in-law of Siegmund Lubin, that concentrated sunlight started the fire. His comments circulated to various news outlets soon after the fire. The popular trade paper Variety quotes him in its June 19 article "Lubin's Big Blaze":

Three weeks later in a separate interview with reporter W. Stephen Bush, which was published in the July 11 issue of The Moving Picture World, Siegmund Lubin reiterates Ira Lowry's comments about the fire's origins, although his statement, like his son-in-law's, is not delivered with any certainty or conviction. "'The fire'", Lubin states, "'will be a lesson and we will know where to store negatives the next time.'" With regard to the fire, he adds, "'I don't believe that the fire started by itself'" [spontaneous combustion]; "'Some rays, may be, got through a prism and started the film burning.'"

Several industry news sources picked up on Lowry's and Siegmund Lubin's comments and cited them jointly in articles as the most plausible explanation for the fire, if not the "official" reason for the tragic loss of so much material. In doing so, the publications advanced the "roof window" or "prism" theory that sunlight streaming through the thick glass of one of the vault unit's skylights had focused a beam on a film can or open reel in storage. Julian M. Soloman of Motion Picture News describes the theory in more detail in his article in the trade journal's June 27, 1914 issue:

Yet, many of Lubinville's lower-level plant employees never accepted the spontaneous-combustion explanation or the "beam of light" theory since the skylights in the vault were fitted with frosted glass, which would have made the focusing of a beam and the magnification of its heat very unlikely. Instead, as recorded in Joseph P. Eckhardt's 1997 biographical work The King of the Movies: Film Pioneer Siegmund Lubin, employees held to another belief about the cause of the fire, an opinion based on their experience of daily plant operations and their personal knowledge about fellow workers at Lubinville. Eckhardt, as a follow-up, also provides in his book some insight as to why that belief was not officially pursued:

Losses
Whatever the cause of the fire, it inflicted a staggering loss to Siegmund Lubin personally. The motion picture mogul tried to remain the "stoical business man" publicly when discussing the destruction of so many films, but the psychological impact of such a calamity was immediately apparent to insiders in the rapidly expanding film industry, including to reporters for leading trade publications. Motography, in a news article titled "Lubin Mourns Lost Negatives" and published two weeks after the event, challenged its readers to consider that impact. "Imagine, then, if you will", posed the news journal, "what must be the loss to [Siegmund Lubin] who is forced to realize that every one of his historic negatives and the first prints of his first pictures are destroyed." Still, with the exceptions of that transfer, the existence of some Lubin prints that remained in circulation in domestic and foreign theaters, and to smaller numbers of wayward prints and stock footage stored at Lubin facilities outside of Pennsylvania, the flames of June 13 wiped out within a few minutes after the initial explosion the bulk of the company's entire cinematic history up to that day. Lost were small and large reels and film cans containing master negatives and prints for several thousand individual titles. Film types ranged from Siegmund Lubin's early and very brief experimental films to longer documentary footage on an array of subjects, along with pristine copies of the company's regular theatrical releases and of pictures produced by some other studios.

Monetary recoveries for the motion pictures lost by Lubin were not possible in 1914, as fire insurance coverage was not generally available for "the dangerous and unpredictable nitrate film stock". The estimated commercial value of the destroyed uninsured films was reported in news sources to be between $500,000–$1,500,000 (equivalent to $–$ today). Additional costs for repairs to other areas of the plant were estimated to range between $10,000 ($ today) and $50,000 ($). All of those unexpected costs and other related expenses proved to be an "unbearable financial disaster" at that time for the Lubin Company, which was borrowing substantial amounts of money to finance its plans to produce longer, more elaborate films and to complete construction projects already under way at Betzwood and at the company's other properties. Borrowed sums were also needed to cover the financial drain caused by ongoing court battles on copyright and patent lawsuits filed against Lubin by Thomas A. Edison, Inc.

Estimated total material costs and other financial losses from fire, smoke, and water damage continued to climb in the aftermath of the disaster. The New York Times reported that overall losses could eventually be as high as $2,000,000 ($ today), an amount that few motion picture studios in 1914 could absorb without considerable hardship. In addition to the vault units' destruction and the total loss of their contents, there were varying degrees of damage across the Lubin property as well as liability expenses for collateral damage to neighboring properties. Private vehicles on the street had been destroyed, and, according to Motion Picture News, the fronts of 10 two-story private row houses across from the vaults burned, seven of them being "seared from cellar to roof" and three others being "somewhat scorched". The Moving Picture World, however, documented even greater damage to nearby residential properties, reporting that 16 houses "were almost wholly destroyed and a score of others were damaged."

Injuries and deaths

Miraculously, given that the powerful explosions and intense fire occurred mid-morning on a Saturday, with several hundred people working at Lubinville and numerous residents living close to the plant, casualties were overall very light. Only 20 employees suffered physical injuries, largely minor ones. Safety procedures and the substantial firewall between working areas inside the plant and the destroyed vault units outside were credited with saving many lives. However, one person near the Lubin property, a 10-year-old "Italian boy" named Roy Didero, was hospitalized after being severely burned. A reel of flaming film hurled by the blast toward a nearby row house had struck the child. Lubin actor Harry Myers, already credited in the press for fighting fires on the plant's rooftops, was further praised for aiding the boy at the scene. Variety reported that once Myers saw the child on fire, the actor ran to him, smothered the flames with his own coat, and carried the youngster "through one of the blazing houses" to safety at a nearby drug store, "where an ambulance was summoned." Myers in that action suffered burns to his hands and arms. News updates did not confirm whether young Didero died, but The New York Times and other papers repeatedly referred to him as "dying" and "not expected to recover".

Losses from Lubin's pre-1914 catalog and films from other studios
Beyond the human toll of injuries and one probable fatality, the fire wiped out a huge collection of films that was described even in contemporary trade publications as "priceless". Those losses included nearly all of Lubin's pre-1914 catalog, approximately 100 newsreels that were ready for release, along with the master negatives and test prints for the Hobart Bosworth Productions Company, the Jesse L. Lasky Feature Play Company, and for D. W. Griffith, a director of major film projects for Mutual Film and Reliance-Majestic Studios in California. Another loss was the master negative and original archived print for the comedy short Outwitting Dad, Oliver Hardy's first credited screen performance. That Lubin production had been initially distributed on April 21, 1914, less than two months before the disaster, and over seven years before Hardy first appeared with Stan Laurel in the 1921 release The Lucky Dog.

The master negatives for two of Griffith's major 1914 dramas were also consumed in the fire: the "six-reeler" Home, Sweet Home, which premiered in Los Angeles on May 17, 1914, and Griffith's seven-reel adaptation of Paul Armstrong's play The Escape, already in limited released less than two weeks before the fire. Griffith had sent the negatives of both films to Lubinville so the Philadelphia company could process higher-quality prints of them for the director and for wider theatrical distribution. Prints of Home, Sweet Home survive from other sources, but The Escape is classified today as lost. Neither a full or partial print nor even a fragment of footage is known to exist from that film, which actress Lillian Gish, a costar in The Escape, characterized it as a "daring topic" about the horrors of syphilis, a photoplay that Gish said Griffith handled with "power and taste". In June 1914, Billboard, a Cincinnati-based publication that covered the music and film industries, confirmed the destruction of the Griffith negatives and some of the other important films that were reduced to ashes in Lubinville's disaster:

Examples of other Lubin releases destroyed
Lost Lubin titles include hundreds of Siegmund Lubin's early kinetoscopic and nickelodeon releases produced during "the pioneer period of the motion picture industry". Many of those are documented in Howard Lamarr Walls' 1953 reference Motion Pictures, 1894–1912, Identified from the Records of the United States Copyright Office. Among the lists of standard drama and comedy shorts recorded in that reference are screen adaptations of many classics from literature such as Rip Van Winkle (1903), Beauty and the Beast (1903), Gulliver’s Travels (1903), Swiss Family Robinson (1903), Snow White (1903), and Julius Caesar (1908). Other lost films include a variety of productions with intriguing, rather strange and unexpected titles from the very early silent era, some that indicate productions with science-fiction, fantasy, educational, and human-interest themes: Trip to the Moon (1899), Sapho (1900), Ostrich Farm (1901), Lubin's Animated Drop-Curtain Announcing Slides (1901), A Trip to Mars (1903) Evolution of the Japanese with the added film description "from a curio-box to a world power in 50 years" (1905), A Dog Lost. Strayed or Stolen. $25 Reward. Apply to Mrs. Brown, 711 Park Ave. (1905), The Life of an Oyster (1907), Miraculous Eggs (1907), The Making of a Modern Newspaper (1907), The Evolution of Man—An Educated Chimpanzee (1908), Baxter's Brain Storm (1907), Acrobatic Pills (1908), Ten Minutes with Shakespeare (1908), A Female Fire Department (1908), The Hebrew Fugitive (1908), A, B, C's of the U.S.A. (1909), Brain-Serum (1909), The Fighting Cigar (1909), and In the Land of Upside Down (1909).

Hundreds of cans of master negatives and reels of initial prints for later Lubin theatrical films—those released between 1910 and the spring of 1914—burned as well. A few examples of those lost dramas and comedies are The Tatooed Arm (1910), A Child of the Sea (1910) filmed in Florida, The Nearsighted Chaperone (1911), The Substitute (1911), The Devine Solution (1912), The Last Rose of Summer (1912), the "powerful and picturesque Indian romance" Back to Primitive (1913), the three-reel drama The Parasite (1913), and a six-reel adaptation of Charles Klein's The Lion and the Mouse released in March 1914. Regrettably, too, the master negatives for cartoonist Vincent Whitman's animated 1914 productions A Trip to the Moon and A Dream of the Circus were among the casualties. Those two lost films, each released as one part of a two-film "split reel" in March and April respectively before the fire, were the first installments in a series of animated shorts that Whitman produced for the Philadelphia studio prior to end of 1915. Although Lubin's A Trip to the Moon carried the same title as Georges Méliès' 1902 groundbreaking sci-fi French classic, the nine-minute 1914 animated comedy portrayed an entirely different story in which the protagonists reach the moon by "aeroplane" instead of by a shell-shaped capsule propelled by a huge cannon.

Documentary films lost
Over nearly two decades, Siegmund Lubin had accumulated, either out of personal interest or for their commercial entertainment value, many hundreds of documentary films relating to historical events and notable personalities, from his first 1897 film of a horse eating hay to early 1914. Lubin during that period routinely dispatched roving camera crews "to capture on slide and motion picture film" assorted natural and man-made disasters and footage of prominent individuals and major political, military, and social events. Soon after the fire, Mr. Lubin was generally reluctant to discuss the magnitude of the films destroyed, but he did express regret about the destruction of some particular footage in one interview:

Lubin's camera crews traveled to the Gettysburg battlefield in 1913 and over the first three days of July filmed the greatest of all reunions. The footage they shot, all of which would burn less than a year later, was used to produce a final one-reel, 15-minute release. That final cut included both grand ceremonies and personal moments: the arrival at Gettysburg of 55,000 war veterans, sweeping views of the attendees' huge encampment, parades of former high-ranging officers and enlisted troops, meetings of old field nurses, and scenes of various "Yankees and Rebels shaking hands".

With regard to other lost documentary films, the following list provides a sampling of losses and the range of their content:

Dedication of the George Washington Monument in Philadelphia's Fairmount Park, attended by President William McKinley (1897)
President McKinley at Camp Alger with his cabinet (1898)
United States General Nelson A. Miles with his staff and "several Naval Commanders of the Spanish-American War" (1898)
The Windsor Hotel Fire in New York City (1899)
The Transvaal War (Second Boer War, 1899–1902) in South Africa 
The Hoboken Docks Fire that killed 326 people (1900) 
The "killer hurricane" of Galveston, Texas (1900)
The Paris Exposition (1900)
The Republican National Convention in Philadelphia (1900)
The Pan-American Exposition in Buffalo, New York, where President McKinley was assassinated (1901) 
Footage of President McKinley being taken to an ambulance after being shot by Leon Czolgosz (1901)
The Funeral of President McKinley (1901)
A Panorama of a Philippine Village (1901)
Footage of the bombardment of Port Arthur during the Russo-Japanese War (1904–1905)
Fire in New York's Bowery (1905)
The San Francisco Earthquake (1906)
Military Parade, Founders Week Celebration in Philadelphia (1908) 
Pagliacci, film of Ruggero Leoncavallo, Italian composer and librettist (1909)
The Cotton Industry of the South (1909)
The Carnival of Venice (1909)
Yellowstone Park (1909)
The Great Ohio Flood (1913)
Funerals of various "foreign monarchs" (1902–1913), films that reportedly "had a large commercial interest abroad"

Unique athletic and medical science films

More historical footage lost in the fire is listed in the previously cited reference Motion Pictures, 1894–1912 by Howard Lamarr Walls and in the July 11, 1914 issue of Motography, which describes a wide range of Lubin films that documented medical innovations, scientific discoveries, and professional athletic competitions that were incinerated in the disaster. Lubin possessed genuine footage as well as staged reproductions of famous turn-of-the-century title and non-title bouts involving fighters such as George Dixon, Joe Gans, Terry McGovern, Young Corbett II, and other boxing champions. Also destroyed were films of early baseball games, one of many being "the crucial game of the baseball season of 1902, when Rube Waddell pitched the Philadelphia Athletics to their first American League championship".

Siegmund Lubin held lifelong interests in medicine and the natural sciences, interests instilled in him as a young man during his university studies in Germany, at Heidelberg, where he earned a degree in ophthalmology before emigrating to the United States in 1876 and finally settling in Philadelphia seven years later. His training in the anatomy of the human eye and his practical experience in manufacturing optical lenses led to Lubin's fascination with cameras and a growing expertise in the technology of still photography and then, by the late 1890s, in the new medium of moving pictures. By the time he formally established the Lubin Manufacturing Company in 1902, Lubin was already experimenting with filming through different lenses and capturing moving images through microscopes and early x-ray cameras and later, in cooperation with Philadelphia's medical community, documenting surgeries, blood transfusions, and assorted ailments and debilitating disorders of many patients at local hospitals and in mental health facilities. Publicly, he was increasingly credited for personally expending "a great deal of money and much of his spare time" promoting the use of moving pictures for scientific purposes and, more specifically, in using films as a teaching tool for surgical training.

All of Lubin's medical films shot prior to the fire were destroyed. While there is no full accounting of those motion pictures or of other science-related footage stored in the demolished vault units, the titles and general descriptions of their content can be found in several published references. For instance, in the April 15, 1911 issue of The Moving Picture World, in a news feature titled "Pictures in Aid of Medical Science", the journal highlights how a few of Lubin's now-lost medical films were used:

Lubin worked extensively with Dr. Weisenburg, who today is recognized internationally as a pioneer in the use of "moving pictures" for comparative neurological studies and classroom instruction. Along with all the other losses in the fire, the destruction of so many innovative medical films was not only another blow to Siegmund Lubin personally but a true misfortune regarding the visual documentation of early 20th-century medicine and surgical practices in the United States.

Recovery and new fire regulations
To reassure the company's domestic and foreign distributors and for the benefit his employees' morale, Siegmund "Pop" Lubin acted immediately to repair facilities at his plant. The prompt action was also intended to demonstrate to the wider film community and to the general public that the studio would recover quickly and that the fire would not significantly disrupt the studio's existing production and release schedules. Only two weeks after the fire, in its June 27, 1914 issue, Motography reports assertions from Lubin's upper management that the company would rapidly resume normal operations:

 Motography also reports in the cited issue that while Siegmund Lubin himself professed that there would be no "hiatus" in the studio's releases, he did admit that "it may not be possible to replace immediately some of the [recently completed] films that burned." Actions at Lubinville to rebuild the demolished film vault in short order further underscored the company's commitment to a rapid recovery. On Monday, June 15, just two days after the fire, Lubin awarded a contract for a new structure. Clean-up and preliminary  design work on the new vault commenced the following day.

Despite Siegmund Lubin's efforts to minimize publicly the damaging effects of the fire and the disaster's effects on him personally, the event detrimentally affected his company's budget and income. Repair and reconstruction costs further depleted Lubin's financial reserves that were already becoming stretched by the company's widespread operations and services, including the ongoing expansion of its new, costly "Betzwood" production plant outside of Philadelphia. The noted loss of master negatives and of some theatrical prints ready for release during the remaining weeks of the summer in 1914 also disrupted and reduced to varying degree Lubin's box-office revenue.

Revised film-storage guidelines
Siegmund Lubin's acceptance of the skylight theory instead of spontaneous combustion or any employee carelessness as the most likely cause of the disaster factored into his company's reconstruction plans for a new vault. A new interior lighting system was a priority in the replacement's design, a system of illumination that Lubin said would "not give rise to any such condition that caused the recent fire." Those design plans were several months ahead of revised safety regulations or "consensus codes" recommended to studios in November 1914 by the National Fire Protection Association (NFPA). Founded in New York City in 1896, the trade association focused considerable attention in its new guidelines on "The Storage of Nitro-Cellulose Motion Picture Films". The widespread coverage in trade publications of the highly destructive fires at Eclair, Edison, Universal, and at Lubinville in 1914 likely underscored to the film industry that additional safety regulations were needed for handing, transporting, and storing film collections.

New safety guidelines announced in the fall of 1914 by the NFPA were to be officially adopted by the organization in January 1915, and they included general specifications for film containers, storage cabinets, and for ventilation and lighting systems in vault construction. Perhaps in response to the Lubin disaster and its cited cause, the guidelines addressed specifically the issue of skylights. While the proposed guidelines did not recommend banning them altogether, they did strongly discourage any further use of them in vaults, stating "To prevent abnormal temperature within the vault, glass windows and skylights should be avoided".

Lubin's bankruptcy and closure

By mid-August 1916, slightly over two years after the vault fire, Lubin's mounting debts and dwindling financial reserves prompted creditors to move in and seize control of the company and to begin restructuring and systematically selling off its assets. The fire was certainly not the decisive factor in the studio's takeover and subsequent closure, but it was one contributing factor in a series of problems that confronted the Lubin Company between 1912 and 1916 and hastened its decline. Unlike some of Lubin's main competitors in that period, the company did not adjust as quickly to the changing tastes and expectations of theater audiences, who wanted longer, more elaborately staged films. That lagging response resulted in a decline in box-office revenue, a reduction made worse by political and military events in Europe, where World War I began only two weeks after the vault fire. As that conflict escalated, Lubin and other American filmmakers had to contend with many disruptions in their most lucrative overseas market.

The next year, in 1915, in an effort to improve substantially his company's theatrical releases, Siegmund Lubin more than doubled the production budgets for future screen projects, a move that required more loans and shutting down some operations outside of Pennsylvania to save money. Further exacerbating the studio's rising monetary pressures were the continuing legal expenses needed to defend itself in copyright and patent lawsuits filed by Edison, along with costs associated with countering federal anti-trust prosecutions. Additional loans and attempts to restructure the business failed. As a result, Siegmund Lubin effectively retired from the film industry in the final months of 1916, and news items the following year began referring to his business as the "old" and the "late Lubin Company". That year both Lubinville and Betzwood, which had continued to operate under receivership, were also sold. Unfortunately for the early cinematic history of the United States, less than 200 of the "nearly" 5,000 films produced by Lubin between 1897 and 1916 are known to survive. The rest are forever lost, falling victim to either dismissive neglect, excessive screenings and mishandling as individual prints moved between theaters, to improper storage, age and nitrate decomposition, or, most notably, to the devastating vault fire of 1914.

See also
 1937 Fox vault fire
 1965 MGM vault fire
 2008 Universal Studios fire
 Nitrate film

Notes

References

1900s lost films
1910s in Philadelphia
1914 disasters in the United States
1914 fires in the United States
1914 in film
1914 in Pennsylvania
Building and structure fires in the United States
Fires in Pennsylvania
June 1914 events
Lubin Manufacturing Company
Warehouse fires
Nitrate-film fires in the United States